Thalmässing is a municipality in the district of Roth, in Bavaria, Germany.

Personalities 
 Argula von Grumbach (Stauff) (1492–1544), author of important reformatory pamphlets
 Joseph Schülein (1854–1938), founder of the brewery Löwenbräu AG 1921 
 Katharina Storck-Duvenbeck (born 1968), German author

References

External links

Roth (district)